White Revolution refers to an Iranian reform movement begun in 1963, and it also may refer to:
 
 White Revolution (India), Operation Flood, a rural development programme in India begun in 1970
 White Revolution (hate group), an American neo-Nazi group, an offshoot of the National Alliance
 White Revolution (Korea), the change in agricultural practices towards protected agriculture in South Korea.
 The 1973 Afghan coup d'état, called by the coup's leader a "White Revolution"